Newsmakers is a 2009 Russian action thriller film directed by Swedish director Anders Banke. It is a remake of the Hong Kong film Breaking News by Johnnie To.

Plot
Moscow police officer Smirnov sets out to capture the violent gangleader Herman after a failed robbery. Meanwhile, Smirnov superiors are trying to find a way to better the reputation of the Moscow police. The young eager pr-girl Katya suggests that they should turn the capture of Herman into a reality show, showing off the police as action heroes. The situation gets complicated when Herman and his gang tries the same tactic. The situation soon escalates into a fullblown war, both in media and on the streets.

Cast

Andrey Merzlikin as Smirnov
Yevgeny Tsyganov as Herman
Mariya Mashkova as Katya
Maksim Konovalov as Kley
Aleksey Frandetti as Orda
Pavel Klimov as Kolyan
Sergei Vesnin as Kon
Sergey Garmash as Killer
Artyom Semakin as Valery
Viktor Chepelov as Sanya
David Stepanyan as Hamlet
Oleg Chernigov as Mikhalych
Pyotr Rytov as Polyakov
Yuri Shlykov as Boldyrev
Vladimir Mikhaliuk as Petrushin
Grigory Baranov as Yura
Ivan Sukhanov as Vadik
Sonya Hilkevich as Sonya
Aleksandr Raschupkin as Vovchik
Sam Klebanov as Roman
Loa Falkman as Tillström
Pavel Stepanov as Traffic police officer
Jurij Kruglov as Traffic police officer
Pavel Misailov as Crying policeman

Production

Anders Banke's horror/black comedy film Frostbite about a gang of teen vampires spreading fear in an arctic town in the far north of Sweden became the highest grossing independent film in Russia 2006, received very positive reviews and reached cult status. The Russian distributors of Frostbite where moving into producing their own films and asked Banke if he wanted to helm a Russian language remake of Johnnie To's film Breaking News and he agrees. Anders Banke who had learned Russian when he got a chance to study film on VGIK had no problem directing the Russian cast. Fittingly, Banke's frequent collaborator Chris Maris had also studied at VGIK. The film was shot in Trollhättan in Sweden and in Moscow. The film was shot on 35 mm like Frostbite as Anders Banke dislikes filming digitally.

Music

The score was composed by Anthony Lledo and performed by the Danish National Chamber Orchestra. Leaders of Men by Joy Division is featured prominently in the film.

Response and boxoffice

Despite an aggressive promotional campaign—producer Klebanov and the film's cast personally presented the film in nearly 20 Russian cities—the film enjoyed scant popularity among Russian audiences and film critics. The producers attributed film's lack of commercial success to its May release, suggesting that May's warm temperatures discourage people from going to the movies. Russians' current lack of interest in national cinema, the alleged absence of a star system in Russia, and—somewhat ironically—the film's insufficient promotion in the Russian media were also cited as culprits in the film's unfavorable commercial and critical reception.

Splash Magazine included the film on its Top Ten list from Tribeca Film Festival 2009 citing it as a must see.

Tiny Beam of Light also provided a positive review of the film praising the score and the entertainment value.

References

External links
 
 Newsmakers at Rotten Tomatoes
 Newsmakers at AllRovi
 Newsmakers at Box Office Mojo
 Newsmakers at Internet Movie Firearms Database
 Watch Trailer.

Fictional portrayals of the Moscow City Police
2009 films
2000s Russian-language films
Russian action thriller films
Russian action drama films
Russian crime action films
Russian crime drama films
Russian thriller drama films
2009 crime drama films
2009 action thriller films
Remakes of Hong Kong films
Films set in Moscow
Films set in Russia